Located 15 minutes outside of Bordeaux, France's capital city, in the Médoc village of Ludon-Médoc, Château D'Agassac is a Haut-Médoc wine estate. Its red wine is a Cru Bourgeois classified in the old Bordeaux Wine Official Classification of 1932 as "Cru Bourgeois Exceptionnel." The location excels in ecotourism as well.

History 

A Latin inscription discovered in the Château's underground chambers, according to local lore, dates the building to the 13th century. Yet Guillaume-Raymond d'Agassac, Lord of Blanquefort, was the first of its known lords, ruling in 1172.

The seigniory of Agassac, which included more than 800 hectares, was owned by the Gaillard de Gassac Family starting in 1238. The lord served as the king of England's vassal. Arnaud Amadieu I, Charles II of Albret, and Jean II of Albret were among the family members who travelled to Agassac after the seigneury was sold to the lordship of Albret in 1357. The Pommiers Family owned the land from 1580 to 1841. The President of Guyenne Parliament House was one of its members.

The winery was established and the first vines were planted in 1792.

A French agricultural engineer named Marcel Richier bought the land in 1841. Wines from the estate were exported during the 19th century under the names Château Ludon and Château Pomiès.

Philippe Capbern-Gasqueton and Henry Capbern-Gasqueton, two members of the Capbern-Gasqueton family, bought Château D'Agassac in 1961. At the same time, Philippe Capbern-Gasqueton was the proprietor of Château Calon-Ségur, one of Saint-18 Estèphe's Cinquièmes Crus (Fifth Growths), and Château du Tertre, one of Saint-14 Estèphe's Troisièmes Crus Classés (Third Growths) in the Bordeaux Wine Official Classification of 1855.

The worldwide insurance company Groupama bought the winery in 1996 and immediately started upgrading the property.

Geology and Terroir 

The estate is situated in the southern part of Ludon-Médoc between two gravelly outcrops and an area of sandy gravel.

The first outcrop consists of extremely fine gravel from the river and is characteristic of the commune of Ludon-Médoc. This gravelly structure, which can reach depths of up to 3 meters, lends itself to draining of water and results in a considerably early ripening of the grapes in this part of the vineyard.

The second outcrop is made up of large Gunz gravel which forms a carpet 6 meters deeper than the first outcrop. However, given the greater proportion of clay, it lends itself to full-bodied wines with a more firm backbone.

Viticulture 

 Area: 43 hectares
 Grape varieties: Merlot 50% / Cabernet Sauvignon 47% / Cabernet Franc 3%
 Average age of the vineyard: 25 years
 Planting density: 6,700 shoots per hectare
 Crop management: Crop thinning, bud and leaf removal
 Certifications: "Terra Vitis" and "Integrated Agriculture"

Harvest/Winemaking 

 Harvest: The grapes are first sorted in the vineyard, then in a second sorting in the cellar
 Winemaking: 23 temperature-controlled stainless steel vats with maceration (wine) for 3 to 4 weeks
 Ageing: 12 to 15 months, 60% in new barrels and 40% in vats
 Coopers: Berthomieu, Cadus, Miquel, Doreau, Baron
 Bottling in the estate: Fining with egg whites and light filtering

Wines 

D'Agassac is one of the wines of the Haut-Médoc with the best scores and the most awards. In April 2003, it was called "One of the 100 best wines of the World" by the Wine Spectator selection in United States.

The winery produces various wines:
 Château D'Agassac: Grand vin of the vineyard, Cru Bourgeois since 1932.
 Château Pomiès-Agassac: second wine of the estate.
 Château Pomiès-Agassac: the other second wine of the property. It is a selection of the finest batches used to produce the Château Pomiès-Agassac "classic"
 L'Agassant D'Agassac: the second label of Château D'Agassac since 2006 made with 90% Merlot grapes.
 Précision D'Agassac: a Vintage Cuvée produced only since 2009.

Enotourism 

The estate is open for visiting and wine tasting. Château D'Agassac, a member of the Great Wine Capitals Global Network, has won the Best Of Wine Tourism Contest in 2006, 2007, 2009 and 2012. It is possible to rent the estate for seminar, dinner or wedding.

External links 
 Château D'Agassac official site 
 Best Of Wine Tourism official site
 Great Wine Capitals Global Network official site

Bibliography 
 Féret, Guide du Vin depuis 1812, sur la façon d'orthographier les appellations d'origine
 Léo Drouyn, La Guienne militaire - Histoire et description des villes fortifiées, forteresses et châteaux [...] pendant la domination anglaise, Tome Second - 1865
 Jacques Gardelles, Les Châteaux du Moyen-Age dans la France du Sud-Ouest - La Gascogne anglaise de 1216 à 1327, 1972
 Henry Ribadieu, Les Châteaux de la Gironde, Deuxième Editions - 1856
 Michel Smaniotto, Le Médoc Féodal - Les grandes seigneuries du XIe au XVe siècle, 1988

Agassac
Agassac